"Obvious Song" is a song by British singer-songwriter and musician Joe Jackson, which was released in 1991 as the second single from his ninth studio album Laughter & Lust. The song was written by Jackson, and produced by Jackson and Ed Roynesdal. The song's music video was directed by Marcus Nispel and produced by Marc Rosenberg.

Background
As Jackson's US debut single for Virgin, "Obvious Song" was selected by the label as a track they believed would generate play on album, alternative and college radio. Diana Fried, product manager for Virgin, told Billboard of the label's decision to release it: "They felt Joe had had a long, illustrious career, but without a whole lot of radio successes in his recent past. To come out with a more pop single right off the bat might not be the best way to let the fans know he's got a new album out, and also might limit where we go with it." The song reached No. 2 on the US Billboard Modern Rock Tracks and No. 28 on Billboard Album Rock Tracks charts.

Critical reception
On its release, Billboard described the song as "rebellious social commentary that gains credibility from the singer's distinctive phrasing." They added: "A ringing '60s style guitar arrangement combined with horns and piano lines make this rhythmically dynamic tune a must for modern and album rock formats." In a review of Laughter & Lust, John Everson of the Southtown Star wrote: "Kicking off with the wryly labeled "Obvious Song," Jackson spits out observations that are obvious, but seldom acted on."

Mark Lepage of The Gazette wrote: "When Laughter & Lust works, it is as brisk, invigorating, tuneful and concise as "Obvious Song"." Roger Catlin of the Hartford Courant commented: "The punchy "Obvious Song" and "It's All Too Much" are worthy rockers with pithy jabs." Parry Gettelman of the Orlando Sentinel considered the song to "perform the difficult task of combining social commentary and pop craftsmanship without sounding preachy or pretentious".

Elysa Gardner of Rolling Stone described the song as a "straight-ahead rocker" which "takes aim at an American rock star who drives around in a gasguzzling limo while preaching to a foreigner who makes his living by cutting down trees". People was more critical of the song, describing it as "preachy", with Jackson "com[ing] across as a swollen, whiny Billy Joel".

Track listing
CD single (US promo)
"Obvious Song" (Edit) - 3:47
"Obvious Song" - 4:11

Personnel
 Joe Jackson - vocals, keyboards
 Tom Teeley - guitar, backing vocals
 Joy Askew - keyboards, backing vocals
 Graham Maby - bass
 Dan Hickey - drums
 Sue Hadjopoulos - drums, percussion

Production
 Joe Jackson - producer
 Ed Roynesdal - producer
 Dan Hersch - editor on "Edit" version
 Larry Alexander - engineer
 Bob Ludwig - mastering

Charts

References

1991 songs
1991 singles
Songs written by Joe Jackson (musician)
Joe Jackson (musician) songs
Virgin Records singles